Vox Piscis, or The Book-Fish,  three treatises which were found in the belly of a cod-fish in Cambridge market, on Midsummer Eve last is a book published in 1627 with a very unusual origin. 

The original text of the work was found in the belly of a fish. On June 23, 1626, scholar and theologian Dr. Joseph Mede (or Mead) of Christ's College, Cambridge, was walking through Cambridge's market, when a fishwife found a small thin book (size sextodecimo) wrapped in sailcloth inside the stomach of a codfish caught at King's Lynn. 

These texts were attributed to Protestant reformer John Frith, who was imprisoned in a fish-cellar in Oxford and later burned at the stake. The texts were published as a book the next year with a preface written by Thomas Goad. The texts have also been attributed to Richard Tracy of Stanbury Manor, Gloucestershire.
 
It is not known how the original book came to be inside the fish.

Contents
Preface
"Praeparatio Crucem or Of the Preparation to the Cross"
"A Lettre which was Written to the Faithfull Followers of Christes Gospell"
"A Mirror, or, Glasse to know thyselfe"

References

External links
 Images from the book at the Folger Shakespeare Library, shelf mark STC 11395.
1627 books
Books about Christianity